Petrobras Junior Team was a team in the FIA Formula 3000 Championship, run by the Petrobras as part of their Brazilian drivers development programme. Named after Williams Formula One team then sponsor, Petrobras, the team was active for the three seasons between 1999 and 2002, earning numerous wins as well as the 2000 drivers title with Bruno Junqueira.

History 
The project was originally conceived as a means of supporting young Brazilian drivers and taking them through the ranks of the world's formulaic motorsport to Formula One.

During the first years of the project there was a search for the best young Brazilian pilots in the South American championships. In the late 1990s, the oilmen entered into a sponsorship agreement with the Williams team, placing their protégé Bruno Junqueira in the place of the test pilot. At the same time, a technical support agreement was signed with Super Nova Racing and an own team was created in the International Formula 3000.

The project in F3000 lasted until the end of 2002. Peak results were obtained in 2000, when the same Bruno Junqueira, in the fight against the main pilot of Super Nova Racing Nicolas Minassian, won the championship title.

The collaboration with Williams ended on the same date. On the eve of the 2000 season, the British could put Junqueira behind the wheel of a combat pilot, but, in the end, they preferred their compatriot Jenson Button to him. The second real attempt to put Jungueira behind the wheel of a competitive car could not be organized and in 2001 the Brazilian left for North America in the local CART Series.

Antônio Pizzonia became the second Brazilian racer who, with the support of oil workers, got into Formula One. In 2002-2005, he served as a test pilot in the same Williams team and in 2004-2005 he spent several races for the team, replacing injured main pilots. In 2003 he ran several races for Jaguar team but was expelled at the end of the season for poor results.

Complete Formula 3000 results

References

External links
 Motorsportstats.com

Brazilian auto racing teams
International Formula 3000 teams
Auto racing teams established in 1999
Auto racing teams disestablished in 2002